Dolindo Ruotolo (6 October 1882, Naples, Italy–19 November 1970, Naples, Italy) was an Italian Catholic priest. He is a candidate for beatification and the Catholic Church has granted him the title "Servant of God".

Ruotolo has been recognized as an advocate of spiritual practice called the "spirituality of surrender". Polish Archbishop Konrad Krajewski, the Papal Almoner, has cited Ruotolo's personal devotion as an inspiration.

Padre Pio said Don Dolindo was a “saint”, that “the whole of Paradise” was in his soul, and once said to a group of Pilgrims from Naples, “Why do you come here, you have Don Dolindo in Naples?, Go to him. He is a saint.” Dolindo called himself “Mary’s little old man.” He lived in such great poverty that his own family turned away from him. He opened his arms without fear to embrace contagious sick people, caressing and kissing them. He offered himself as a victim soul for mankind, and was afflicted with many sufferings, including complete paralysis for the last ten years of his life.

In 1941, Ruotolo, writing under the pseudonym of "Dain Cohenel", distributed to the Italian Catholic bishops a pamphlet attacking Catholic biblical scholarship, Un gravissimo pericolo per la Chiesa e per le anime. II sistema critico-scientifico nello studio e nell'interpretazione della Sacra Scrittura, le sue deviazioni funeste e le sue aberrazioni, for which he was censured by the Pontifical Biblical Commission. He accused historical-critical methods of being the product of an "accursed spirit of pride, presumption, and superficiality, disguised under minute investigations and hypocritical literal exactness". Ruotolo authored a ten-thousand page Bible commentary, La Sacra Scrittura, which on 20 November 1940 was placed on the Index of Forbidden Books.

Ruotolo had the gift of prophecy, writing to Bishop Huilica in 1965 that “a new John will rise out of Poland with heroic steps to break the chains beyond the boundaries imposed by the communist tyranny.” This prophecy was said to have been realized in Pope John Paul II.

References 

1882 births
1970 deaths
Italian Servants of God
20th-century Italian Roman Catholic priests
People from Naples